Colle Caruno is a frazione (outlying area) of the Commune of Teramo in the Abruzzo Region of Italy. It is located about four miles from the communal capital. In times past the village has been referred to in documents as Colacaruni or  Collecaruni.   These names likely derive from a certain Cola (Niccola) Caruni, buried in a graveyard in Teramo.

Colle Caruno falls under the bishopric of Teramo. In 1123 one large feud existed made up of Colle Caruno along with Gesso (today Villa Gesso), Castagneto, and Pozo Rotari (likely today's Poggio Rattieri). It was administered by the Totoneschi family.

Historians pint to the existence of the Chiesa di San Giacaomo (Church of Saint James) as far back as 1271. In 1804 the area in and around Colle Coruno was reported to have 19 inhabitants falling under the jurisdiction of Teramo, 26 inhabitants under the jurisdiction of Montorio al Vomano, and 27 inhabitants under the jurisdiction of Bisegno. During the Napoleonic era in the early 18900's the village was included in what was then referred to as the Circondario di Teramo (Teramo Provincial Holdings). In 1813 the area, along with Forcella and Magnanella con Gesso, was officially placed within the commune of Teramo.

Bibliografia
Niccola Palma, Storia ecclesiastica e civile della regione più settentrionale del regno di Napoli. Detta dagli antichi Prætutium, ne' bassi tempi Aprutium oggi città di Teramo e Diocesi Aprutina, vol. II, p. 44, 254; vol. III, p. 49, 128, 222n, 276A, 348, 419, 470; vol. IV, p. 34, 109, 226, 296, 297, Teramo, presso U. Angeletti, 1832-1836; II edizione a cura di Vittorio Savorini e altri, 5 voll., Teramo, Tip. Giovanni Fabbri, 1890-1893; III edizione, 5 voll. Teramo, Cassa di Risparmio della Provincia di Teramo, 1978.  (In Italian)

See also
Teramo
Colle Caruno - Sito Ufficiale

Frazioni of the Province of Teramo
Teramo